The Douglas CG-19 was a late 1940s assault glider project conceived by the Douglas Aircraft Company.

Development
Chase and Douglas were awarded contracts to build 'light glider' prototypes, with the Chase design being designated XCG-18 and the Douglas Model 1028 receiving the XCG-19 designation. A mockup of the CG-19 was inspected in March 1947, but when the US Air Force was facing tight budget constraints with respect to the CG-18 and CG-19 designs, it decided to cancel the CG-19 because the CG-18 was nearing completion.

Specifications

Notes

References 

CG-19
1940s United States military gliders
1940s United States military transport aircraft
Low-wing aircraft